Christos Tomaras (born 14 January 1989) is an Australian-Greek footballer currently playing for Sydney Olympic in the National Premier Leagues NSW as a striker.

Career
Christos Tomaras began playing professional football with Apollon Kalamaria .
He also played for Kozani and Eordaikos 2007 . Then he transferred to Paniliakos .
He moved to the Elia club from Eordaikos 2007 on 12 September 2011.

References

External links
 
 
 
 Onsports.gr profile 

1989 births
Living people
Australian soccer players
Association football forwards
Apollon Pontou FC players
Paniliakos F.C. players
Sydney Olympic FC players
National Premier Leagues players
Soccer players from Sydney